The 1998 Austrian Grand Prix was a Formula One motor race held at the A1-Ring on 26 July 1998. It was the tenth round of the 1998 FIA Formula One World Championship. A wet-dry qualifying session resulted in a mixed-up grid order, with Giancarlo Fisichella taking the first pole position of his career. The 71-lap race was won by Mika Häkkinen for McLaren, with teammate David Coulthard recovering to finish second, having been involved in two collisions during the race, and Michael Schumacher finishing third for Ferrari.

Report

Qualifying

The qualifying session led to an unusual grid due to wet conditions which dried out towards the end, with Fisichella taking his first ever pole and Alesi alongside him in the Sauber.

Race
Mika Häkkinen started well to lead into the first corner, but several cars collided at the first corner behind them, with Takagi's car ending up stranded. Olivier Panis was left immobile on the line with clutch failure.

At the second corner there was another accident, with both Arrows drivers colliding, hitting David Coulthard in the process and knocking off his wing after he had qualified in 14th. Coulthard entered the pit lane for a new nose, but fortunately for him a safety car was deployed to allow the debris from the collisions to be cleaned up, and he was able to catch up to the back of the field.

At the restart Häkkinen led away again with Schumacher close behind him. Schumacher attempted to pass Häkkinen but ran wide, allowing Fisichella in the Benetton past him and almost Rubens Barrichello in the Stewart as well. Barrichello soon dropped out with brake problems, while Schumacher overtook Fisichella again.

Schumacher was already on a disadvantage with a two-stop strategy, and Häkkinen on just one, but his situation got worse when he ran very wide, bouncing violently through the gravel trap and ripping off his front wing. He was able to reach the pits and fit a new wing, but rejoined almost a lap behind. Around the same time Frentzen in the Williams experienced an engine failure which caught fire, but he was able to escape from the car unharmed.

21 laps in, Fisichella and Alesi clashed at the second corner, with both having to retire. Coulthard and Michael Schumacher were both quickly moving back up through the field, but Michael had a lot of trouble passing his brother Ralf Schumacher in the Jordan, finally succeeding after several laps.

Michael Schumacher then started to catch up to teammate Eddie Irvine, who was slowing; Irvine said after it was due to marginal brakes, but some suggested he was asked to move over for his team leader.

In the end, Häkkinen took an easy victory. His teammate Coulthard finished second after being last at the start, and Michael Schumacher took third aided by his teammate Eddie Irvine.

Classification

Qualifying 

This was the last pole position of Benetton in Formula One

Race

Championship standings after the race
Bold text indicates who still has a theoretical chance of becoming World Champion.

Drivers' Championship standings

Constructors' Championship standings

 Note: Only the top five positions are included for both sets of standings.

References

Austrian Grand Prix
Grand Prix
Austrian Grand Prix
July 1998 sports events in Europe